Portadown is a town in County Armagh, Northern Ireland. It is in the Armagh City, Banbridge and Craigavon Borough Council area and had a population of about 22,000 at the 2011 Census. For some purposes, Portadown is treated as part of the "Craigavon Urban Area", alongside Craigavon and Lurgan.

Although Portadown can trace its origins to the early 17th century Plantation of Ulster, it was not until the Victorian era and the arrival of the railway that it became a major town. It earned the nickname "hub of the North" due to it being a major railway junction; where the Great Northern Railway's line diverged for Belfast, Dublin, Armagh and Derry. In the 19th and 20th centuries Portadown was also a major centre for the production of textiles (mainly linen).

Portadown is the site of the long-running Drumcree dispute, over yearly marches by the Protestant Orange Order through the Catholic part of the town, which often sparked violence and protests. In the 1990s, the dispute escalated and prompted a massive security operation, drawing worldwide attention to Portadown.

History

Early history and Plantation of Ulster
The Portadown area had long been populated by Irish Gaels. At the beginning of the 1600s, it lay within the district of Clancann (Clann Chana), which was part of the larger territory of Oneilland (Uí Nialláin). This district was named after the dominant local clan—the McCanns (Mac Cana)—who had been in the area since before the 13th century. The McCanns were then a vassal sept of the O'Neills (Uí Néill). On the eastern banks of the River Bann was the district of Clanbrasil (Clann Bhreasail).

The town's name comes from the Irish Port a' Dúnáin (or, more formally, Port an Dúnáin), meaning the port or landing place of the small fort. This was likely a fort of the McCanns.

From 1594 until 1603, the O'Neills and an alliance of other clans fought in the Nine Years' War against the Tudor conquest of Ireland. This ended in defeat for the Irish clans, and much of their land was seized and redistributed by the Crown. In 1608, King James VI and I began the Plantation of Ulster – the organised colonisation of the region by Protestant settlers from Britain, known as 'planters'.

In 1610, as part of the Plantation, the lands of Portadown were granted to William Powell. In 1611, he sold his grant of land to Reverend Richard Rolleston, who in turn sold it in two portions to Richard Cope and Michael Obins. Obins built a large Elizabethan-style mansion for himself and his family, and a number of houses nearby for English tenants. This mansion was in the area of the present-day Woodside estate, and today's People's Park was part of its grounds. The park is now bounded on either side by Obins Street and Castle Street, both of which are references to "Obin's Castle". In 1631, Obins was granted a licence for a "fair and market", which led to the building of the first bridge across the River Bann shortly thereafter.

Irish rebellion of 1641
During the Irish Rebellion of 1641, Obins Castle was captured by a force of dispossessed Irish led by the McCanns, Magennises and O'Neills. In November 1641, Irish rebels—likely under the command of Toole McCann—killed about 100 captured British settlers by forcing them off the Bann bridge and shooting those who swam ashore. This became known as the "Portadown massacre" and was one of the worst atrocities of the rebellion. It fuelled revenge killings during the conflict that followed and was used to justify the Cromwellian conquest of Ireland. The Irish Confederate troops abandoned Obins Castle during the Cromwellian conquest, and Hamlet Obins (who had survived its capture) repossessed it in 1652. It was then passed to his son, Anthony Obins.

Industrialisation
In 1741, Anthony Obins was involved with the development of the Newry Canal. He was succeeded by Michael Obins in 1750. It was he who set up a linen market in Portadown in 1762 and this laid the foundations of Portadown's major industry.

Michael Obins died in 1798 and left a son, Michael Eyre Obins, to succeed him. In 1814, Eyre Obins took holy orders and sold the estate to the Sparrow family of Tandragee. George Montagu, 6th Duke of Manchester (known as Viscount Mandeville) married Millicent Sparrow in 1822 and came into possession of the estate. This family's legacy to the town includes street names such as Montagu Street, Millicent Crescent and Mandeville Street, as well as buildings such as the Fergus Hall (formerly the Duke's School and Church Street PS), and the Carleton Home (the Duke's former townhouse, latterly a maternity hospital/nurses accommodation and now private apartments).

The Blacker family, descended from Danes who entered Ireland in the 9th century, founded an estate at Carrick, on the Portadown–Gilford road. The land had been bought by Colonel Valentine Blacker from Sir Anthony Cope of Loughgall. It became known as Carrickblacker, and is now the site of Portadown Golf Club. One of the notables in the Blacker family, Colonel William Blacker, High Sheriff of Armagh, took part in the "Battle of the Diamond" and was a founding member of the Orange Order. This, and subsequent events like the setting up of a 'provisional' Grand Lodge in the town after the 'voluntary' dissolution of the Order in 1825, led to the town being known as 'The Orange Citadel' and was a center of sectarian strife for two centuries. Many of the Blacker family were soldiers or churchmen. The family estate was purchased in 1937 by Portadown Golf Club, who demolished Carrickblacker House in 1988 to make way for a new clubhouse.

World War II

A large prisoner-of-war (POW) camp was built at Portadown during World War II. It was at the site of a former sports facility on what was then the western edge of town. This area is now covered by housing from Fitzroy Street and the Brownstown Estates. The camp housed (mostly) German POWs. For a time these POWs were guarded by Welsh servicemen who had been transferred from Germany (known as "Bluecaps") and who were billeted at St Patrick's Hall in Thomas Street.

The local newspaper carried a story of another POW camp, adjacent to Killicomaine Castle (also known as Irwin's Castle) in what was then known as "Cullen's Lane" but is now called "Princess Way" and part of the Killicomaine estate, built in 1954 and largely contemporary with other estates built by the then Portadown Borough Council and the former Northern Ireland Housing Trust (now called the Northern Ireland Housing Executive).

A third camp was built on the Carrickblacker estate towards the end of the war, possibly as an overflow for the nearby Elmfield Camp in Gilford, but was used as accommodation for Allied troops and no Axis pow's were ever imprisoned there.

In 2005, a public air-raid shelter was uncovered during excavation works near the riverbank just outside the town centre. One of ten built by the council during World War II, it is one of only two now remaining, the other at the new roundabout on the Gilford Road, and a rare example of public air raid shelters in Northern Ireland.

The Troubles

During the Troubles, there were numerous shootings, bombings and riots in Portadown. The conflict led to the deaths of 45 people in the town. Loyalists killed 25 people: eighteen Catholic civilians, three Protestant civilians, two members of the security forces, a republican paramilitary and a loyalist paramilitary. Irish republicans killed 18 people: nine members of the security forces, one loyalist paramilitary, seven Protestant civilians and one Catholic civilian. The security forces killed one Protestant civilian, and another loyalist was killed by his own bomb. In 1993 and 1998, the town centre was devastated by two large car bombs planted by republicans.

The Troubles led to the town becoming segregated – the northwestern part of the town became almost wholly populated by the Catholic/Irish nationalist minority, while the rest of the town became almost wholly Protestant/unionist. Portadown's 'Catholic district' is bordered by the railway line and by a security barrier ("peace wall") along Corcrain Road.

The Troubles also intensified the long-running Drumcree marching dispute, over Orange marches through the Catholic part of town. Each July from 1995 to 2000, the dispute drew worldwide attention as it sparked protests and violence throughout Northern Ireland, prompted a massive police/British Army operation, and threatened to derail the peace process. The Army sealed-off the Catholic part of Portadown with large steel, concrete and barbed-wire barricades and the situation was likened to a "war zone" and a "siege".

Each summer, during the "marching season", there are many Protestant/loyalist marches in the town. Loyalists put up numerous flags and raise arches over some streets. These marches, and the raising of these flags and arches near the homes of Catholic families, continues to be a source of tension and sometimes violence.

Community leaders in Portadown have been involved with the Ulster Project since it began in 1975. The project involves teenagers from both of Northern Ireland's main communities. The goal is to foster goodwill and friendship between them. Each year, a group of teenagers are chosen to travel to the United States, where they stay with an American family for a few weeks.

Geography

Portadown sits in a relatively flat part of Ireland, near the southern shore of Lough Neagh. There are two small wetland areas on the outskirts of the town; one at Selshion in the west and another at Annagh in the south. The Ballybay River flows into the town from the west before joining the River Bann.

River Bann
Most of the town is built on the western side of the River Bann, and owes much of its prosperity to the river. It was the construction of the Newry Canal (linking Carlingford Lough with Lough Neagh) in 1740, which enabled Portadown to become a hub for the water traffic between Newry and Belfast.

There are three bridges across the river at Portadown. Bridge Street and Northway are both road bridges and there is a railway bridge beside the Northway. The 'Bann Bridge' on Bridge Street is the oldest. The story of this bridge is unusual in that it was built without a river running underneath it. After building was complete, the course of the River Bann was diverted by some 100 yards to straighten a meander. The old riverbed was then built upon. An archaeological dig in the area of the old riverbed uncovered the bones of some of those drowned in the 1641 massacre.

Townlands
Like the rest of Ireland, the Portadown area has long been divided into townlands, whose names mostly come from the Irish language. Portadown sprang up along a road (High Street/Market Street) that marked the boundary between two of these – Tavanagh and Corcrain. Over time, the surrounding townlands have been built upon and they have given their names to many roads and housing estates. The following is a list of townlands within Portadown's urban area, alongside their likely etymologies:

West bank of the River Bann (parish of Drumcree):
Annagh
Ballyoran (from Baile Uaráin meaning "townland of the spring")
Baltylum (from Bailte Loma meaning "bare townlands")
Clounagh or Clownagh (from Cluaineach  meaning "place of the water-meadow")
Corcrain (from Corr Chrainn meaning "round hill of the tree")
Garvaghy (from Garbh Achadh meaning "rough field")
Mahon or Maghon (from Maigh Ghamhan meaning "plain of the calves")
Selshion (from Soilseán meaning "shining place")
Tavanagh (from Tamhnach meaning "grassland")

East bank of the River Bann (parish of Seagoe):
Ballyhannon (from Baile Uí Sheanacháin meaning "O'Shannon's townland")
Bocombra (formerly Bocomra, from Bac Iomarach meaning "ridged bank")
Edenderry (from Éadan Doire meaning "hill-brow of the oak grove")
Kernan (formerly Kerhanan, from Caorthannán meaning "place of rowans")
Killycomain or Killicomain (from Coill Uí Chomáin meaning "Ó Comáin's woodland")
Levaghery (from Leathmhachaire meaning "half plain")
Lisnisky (from Lios an Uisce meaning "ringfort of the water") – the fields in Lisnisky separate Portadown from Craigavon
Seagoe Upper (from Suidhe Gobha meaning "seat of Gobhan")

Climate
The climate of Portadown is like that of much of the rest of the UK and Ireland, being a temperate oceanic climate. It has mild temperatures throughout the year, with summer temperatures not reaching levels to be deemed very hot and winter not very cold. The consistently humid climate that prevails over Ireland can make these temperatures feel uncomfortable when they stray into the high 20s °C (80–85 °F), more so than similar temperatures in hotter climates in the rest of Europe. It also receives a steady amount of rainfall throughout the year.

Demography
For census purposes, Portadown is not treated as a separate entity by the Northern Ireland Statistics and Research Agency (NISRA). Instead, it is combined with Craigavon, Lurgan and Bleary to form the "Craigavon Urban Area". However, a fairly accurate population count can be arrived at by combining the data of the electoral wards that make up Portadown. These wards are Annagh, Ballybay, Ballyoran, Brownstown, Corcrain, Edenderry, Killycomain and Tavanagh.

On the day of the last census (27 March 2011) the combined population of these wards was 22,899. 
Of this population:
13,957 (60.9%) were Protestant or from a Protestant background
7,300 (31.8%) were Catholic or from a Catholic background
1,642 (7.3%) were of other religious backgrounds or no religious background.

Immigrants make up about 8% of the town's population, many of whom come from Eastern Europe, Portugal and East Timor, as well as China and India.

Governance

Portadown is part of the Upper Bann constituency for elections to the Northern Ireland Assembly and Parliament of the United Kingdom. The boundaries of the Assembly constituency and Parliament constituency are identical. This has long been a safe unionist seat.

Portadown came under the governance of Portadown Borough Council following the Local Government (Ireland) Act 1898. This was abolished with the Local Government (Boundaries) Act (Northern Ireland) 1971 and the Local Government Act (Northern Ireland) 1972. Henceforth, the town had been under the jurisdiction of the larger Craigavon Borough Council. However, after local government reform the town is now part of one of Northern Ireland's largest councils, the Armagh, Banbridge and Craigavon Borough Council. Councillors are elected to the council every four years by proportional representation.

The councillors for the DEA are:

Religious sites
Portadown sits on the boundary between two parishes. This boundary is the River Bann. The part of the town on the west of the Bann is in Drumcree parish, while the part of the town on the east of the Bann is in Seagoe parish.

Protestant churches
The site of the Methodist church has moved several times and it now stands in Thomas Street.

In 1826, Saint Martin's Church of Ireland was built, and later renamed Saint Mark's. Before this, Church of Ireland members attended either Drumcree Parish Church or Seagoe Parish Church.

The current Seagoe Parish Church of St. Gobhan's (Church of Ireland), was built in 1814, and replaced the many previous church foundations dating from circa the 7th century, which existed in the ancient cemetery of Seagoe some one hundred yards distant. It is linked to Seagoe Primary School, which is maintained by the Church, and one of the few remaining Anglican primary schools. The former Primus of the Scottish Episcopal Church, Most Revd David Chillingworth was rector at Seagoe for 19 years. St Columba's Parish on the Loughhall Road, and Knocknamuckley Church of Ireland (St. Matthias) on the Bleary Road are also extant parishes.

There are two Presbyterian churches, First Portadown (aka Edenderry) Presbyterian Church (1822) and Armagh Road Presbyterian Church (1859). The Rev Stafford Carson was Moderator of the Presbyterian Church in Ireland, June 2009 to June 2010.

There are Baptist meeting halls on Thomas Street and Killicomaine Road; an Elim church on Clonavon Avenue; a Quaker meeting hall on Portmore Street; a large Free Presbyterian congregation meets in Levaghery. The pentecostal Light of the World Ministries are located in the town, as are the evangelical neocharismatic Vineyard Church. The Salvation Army have a hall in Edward Street.

Catholic churches
Saint John the Baptist's Church was built in the townland of Ballyoran in 1783. The original church sat in the middle of what is now a large graveyard. A second Catholic church, Saint Patrick's, was built on William Street in 1835.

In the 1980s Saint John's was taken down brick-by-brick, moved and rebuilt at the Ulster Folk and Transport Museum in Cultra, County Down. A new Saint John's church was built close to where the original stood; it sits where the Garvaghy Road meets the Dungannon Road and was completed in 1977.

Other churches
The Church of Jesus Christ of Latter-day Saints has a church on the Brownstown Road. In addition the Jehovah's Witnesses have a Kingdom Hall, on the town outskirts in Kernan.

Transport

A combination of road, canal and rail links, all converging on Portadown railway station, gave it the nickname "Hub of the North" and this created employment through mass industry as well as helping the traditional agronomy of the area. The Newry Canal, opened in 1742, linked Carlingford Lough and the Irish Sea with Lough Neagh. It joined the River Bann a couple of miles to the southeast of Portadown. The canal opened up waterborne trade and left Portadown ideally situated to take full advantage of the trading routes. However, the canal went into decline with the growth of the railway network and it closed to commercial traffic in 1936.

With the establishment of the Great Northern Railway the overland trading routes were extended and delivery times shortened. The town's first railway station opened in 1842.

At Portadown railway station the line went in four directions – one went northeast toward Belfast, one northwest toward Dungannon, one southwest to Armagh and one southeast toward Newry and onward to Dublin. Today only the Belfast–Dublin line remains. Repair yards were opened in 1925 and these large concrete buildings dominated the skyline on the west of the town centre. The current station opened in 1970.

National Cycle Route 9 links Portadown with Belfast and Newry.

Economy
Portadown's major employers have includd:
Irwin's Bakery was established in 1912 by William David Irwin, grandfather of the existing joint managing directors, as a grocery retailer. It expanded into Great Britain and the Republic of Ireland in the 1980s.
 Wade (Ireland) Ltd. Wade Ceramics had a substantial plant in Portadown between in Watson Street, Edenderry, adjacent to the Victorian Railway Station. The factory closed in 2002.
 Ulster Carpets Ltd was established in the town in 1938 and was the major employer producing woolen Axminster. 
Henry Denny & Sons (NI) Ltd. meat processors were originally established in Obins Street, but moved to Corcrain after being acquired by  the Kerry Group in 1982.

Linen manufacturing
Much of the town's industry in the 19th and 20th century was centred around the linen trade. The 1881 edition of Slater's Directory (a comprehensive listing of Irish towns) listed 15 manufacturing employers in Portadown at that time.

Landmarks

Portadown Town Hall, in Edward Street, was once the seat of the town's local government until reform of local government in 1972. It is an 1890 Victorian building that has been extensively refurbished and offers an in-house theatre and conference facilities.

The Millennium Court Arts Centre contains two galleries allowing local artists to exhibit their work.

Ardress House is a 17th-century farmhouse that was remodelled in Georgian times and is today owned by the National Trust. It is open to the public offering guided tours, local walks, and recreations of farmyard life.

The Newry Canal Way is a fully accessible restored canal towpath now usable as a bicycle route between Newry Town Hall and the Bann Bridge in Portadown. The Canal was the first summit level canal in Britain and Ireland and has 14 locks between its entrance at Carlingford Lough and Lough Neagh.

One of the attractions on the Newry Canal Way is Moneypenny's Lock, a site that includes an 18th-century lock-keeper's house, stables and bothy. This provided accommodation for workers on the canal and their horses in the days when the canal was part of the industrial transport network. Today it is administered jointly by the Museum Services and the Lough Neagh Discovery Centre at Oxford Island.

Located just outside the town off the Dungannon Road is the only fully restored Royal Observer Corps Cold War Nuclear Monitoring Bunker in Northern Ireland. Opened in 1958 it, plus a further 57 other bunkers spread throughout Northern Ireland, would have been used to monitor and report the effects of a Nuclear Attack. The bunker, which was closed and abandoned in 1991 was fully restored to its 1980s appearance and opened as a museum in 2010.

Notable people

Deceased people
Harris Boyle (1953–1975) was a high-ranking Ulster Volunteer Force (UVF) member who was blown up when he and another member planted a bomb onto the Miami Showband's minibus.
George Gilmore (1898–1985) was a Protestant Irish Republican Army (IRA) leader during the 1920s and 1930s. In 1934 he left the IRA and helped set up the Republican Congress and the Connolly Column. Thereafter, Gilmore remained a significant left wing figure within the republican movement.
Marion Greeves MBE (1894–1979) was the first of only two female members of the Senate of Northern Ireland. She served as an independent from June 1950 until June 1969.
Sir Robert Hart (1835–1911) was a British consular official in China, who served from 1863 to 1911 as the second Inspector-General of China's Imperial Maritime Custom Service (IMCS).
Eric Mervyn Lindsay OBE (1907–1974) was an astronomer who was instrumental in setting up Armagh Planetarium. He was also responsible for persuading the Irish government and Harvard University to found a telescope at Boyden Station in South Africa for the purpose of charting the southern skies. He has a crater on the moon named after him.
Harold McCusker (1940–1990) was an Ulster Unionist politician who served MP for Upper Bann till his death, and was tipped to be a future party leader.
Robert Russell (c. 1858–1938) was an Irish mathematician and academic who served as Erasmus Smith's Professor of Mathematics at Trinity College Dublin
Alexander Walker (1930–2003) was a film critic who worked for the Birmingham Post in the 1950s and the London Evening Standard from 1960 until his death. He was a highly influential figure within the film industry and also wrote a number of books on the topic.
D'Arcy Wentworth (1762–1827), surgeon and founder of an Australian political dynasty.
Billy Wright (1960–1997) was a loyalist paramilitary leader who spent much of his life in Portadown. He led the Mid Ulster Brigade of the UVF before founding a breakaway group called the Loyalist Volunteer Force (LVF) in 1996. He was assassinated by the Irish National Liberation Army (INLA).

Living people
Gloria Hunniford (born 1940) is a TV and radio presenter and formerly a singer. She is the mother of Caron Keating, who died of breast cancer in 2004.
Victor Sloan MBE (born 1945) is a photographer and artist who lives and works in Portadown. Employing primarily the medium of photography, he manipulates his negatives and reworks his prints with paints, inks, toners and dyes. In addition to photography, he also uses video, and printmaking techniques.
David Simpson (born 1959) former Democratic Unionist Party (DUP) Member of Parliament for Upper Bann.
Brendan McKenna  is an Irish republican activist and spokesman of the Garvaghy Road Residents' Coalition. He was a Sinn Féin political advisor until 2007 and became General Secretary of éirígí in 2009.
Les Binks is a drummer who is best known for having been the drummer of Judas Priest between March 1977 and July 1979.
Aaron McCusker (born 1978) is an actor most famous for playing Jamie Maguire in Channel 4's comedic drama series Shameless.
Paddy Johns (born 1968) was an Irish rugby union player from 1990 until 2000 who represented Ulster and Ireland. He played at the 1995 Rugby World Cup finals and the 1999 Rugby World Cup finals. 
Colin Turkington (born 1982) is an auto racing driver and is the reigning British Touring Car Champion.
Adam Carroll (born 1982) is also an auto racing driver who raced for A1 Team Ireland in the A1 Grand Prix series and won in 2008-09. Carroll has also raced for FMS International in the GP2 Series.
Leigh Alderson (born 1986) is a male ballet dancer, model, actor and choreographer. Alderson was nominated for The Arts Personality of the Year Award in the Ulster Tatler Awards in two consecutive years, 2009 and 2010
Newton Emerson is a journalist and founder of the satirical online newspaper Portadown News.
Chris Pennell, English rugby union player, was raised in the town.
 Lady Mary Peters (born 6 July 1939) former British athlete, best known for the pentathlon and shotput. She was born in England but relocated at age 11 to Portadown and was educated at Portadown College.
 Michael Andrew Martin O'Neill MBE (5 July 1969) Football manager

Education

Portadown has (or had) a large selection of academic institutions, past and present. Today, schools in Portadown operate under the Dickson Plan, a transfer system in north Armagh that allows pupils at age 11 the option of taking the 11-plus exam to enter grammar schools, with pupils in comprehensive junior high schools being sorted into grammar and non-grammar streams. Pupils can get promoted to or demoted from the grammar stream during their time in those schools depending on the development of their academic performance, and at age 14 can take subject-based exams across the syllabus to qualify for entry into a dedicated grammar school to pursue GCSEs and A-levels.

Primary education
The state-run Thomas Street Primary School, and Church Street Primary School, formerly the "Duke's School", were both incorporated into Millington Primary School 1970. Other state-run primary schools include Ballyoran Primary School, Bocombra Primary School, Edenderry Primary School, Hart Memorial Primary School, Moyallan Primary School, Portadown Primary School, Richmount Primary School, and the Anglican Seagoe Primary School. Derrycarne Primary School is now used as an Orange Hall by the Orange Order.

Primary schools managed by the Council for Catholic Maintained Schools are Presentation Convent Primary School, St John the Baptist Primary School (Irish: Bunscoil Eoin Baiste), which has both English-medium and Irish-medium units within it, and St. John's Primary School. St Columba's Primary School in Carleton Street is now closed. 

There is a multi-denominational or integrated primary school in the town, Portadown Integrated Primary School, which opened in 1990.

Post-primary education
 Portadown College (Controlled) - a grammar school which was opened in 1924
 Clounagh Junior High School (Controlled)
 Craigavon Senior High School (Controlled),
 Killicomaine Junior High School (Controlled)
 St John the Baptist's College (Catholic Maintained)
 Southern Regional College - Portadown Technical College, later Portadown College of Further Education, was merged with Lurgan CFE and Banbridge CFE to form the Upper Bann Institute of Further Education. Further Education in the region was consolidated again when the institute was merged with other FE colleges in Armagh, Newry and Kilkeel to form the Southern Regional College.

Healthcare

Access to a GP is provided at Portadown Health Centre.  Hospital care and Accident and Emergency services are available at Craigavon Area Hospital, built 1972 on the outskirts of town as part of the Craigavon development.

Sport

Association football is played by Portadown F.C. who play in the NIFL Premiership, Annagh United of the NIFL Championship, and Bourneview Young Men F.C., Hanover F.C., St Mary's Youth F.C. and Seagoe F.C. of the Mid-Ulster Football League. 

Rugby is played by Portadown Rugby Club, and Gaelic football is played by Tír na nÓg GAA Club.

Media
Portadown's main local newspaper is the Portadown Times, which is published by Johnston Publishing (NI). Although the newspaper focuses on the Portadown area, it also serves towns and villages across north Armagh. It was founded in 1924 and is issued weekly.

Between 2001 and 2005, Portadown resident Newton Emerson ran a controversial satirical online newspaper called the Portadown News. The website, which was updated biweekly, attracted media attention by poking fun at Northern Ireland politics and culture.

See also

List of towns in Northern Ireland
List of villages in Northern Ireland

References

Bibliography
Craigavon Borough Council Elections 1993 – 2005
Culture Northern Ireland

Towns in County Armagh